The Consortium for Elections and Political Process Strengthening (CEPPS) is composed of nonprofit, nonpartisan, nongovernmental organizations dedicated to advancing and supporting democratic practices and institutions around the globe. Established in 1995, CEPPS pools the expertise of three premier international organizations dedicated to democratic development: the International Foundation for Electoral Systems, the International Republican Institute and the National Democratic Institute.

CEPPS now has a 25-year track record of collaboration and leadership in democracy, human rights and governance support. As mission driven, nonprofit democracy organizations, CEPPS differs from many development actors by maintaining long-term relationships with political parties, election management bodies, parliaments, civil society organizations and democracy activists. CEPPS operates as a consortium (under a joint venture) to provide USAID and other donors with the capacity to deliver complex democracy, rights and governance (DRG) programming at scale across the entire spectrum of political contexts and geographic regions.

References

External links
Election Guide at CEPPS

United States Agency for International Development